Sigma 6 may refer to:

 G.I. Joe: Sigma 6, a line of military-themed action figures and toys
 SDS Sigma 6, one of the SDS Sigma series of computers made by Scientific Data Systems
 Pink Floyd, a British rock group originally called Sigma 6

See also
 Six Sigma, a set of techniques and tools for process improvement
 68–95–99.7 rule, or Three sigma rule, in statistics